Ignaz Heinrich Karl von Wessenberg (4 November 17749 August 1860) was a German writer and scholar, and liberal Catholic churchman as well as Vicar general and administrator of the Diocese of Constance. Imbued from his early youth with Josephinistic and Febronian principles, he advocated a German National Church, somewhat loosely connected with Rome, supported by the State and protected by it against papal interference. He encouraged the use of the vernacular in liturgical texts, the hymn book and the regular Sunday sermon.

Life
Born at Dresden, Ignaz Heinrich Wessenberg was the son of an aristocratic Breisgau family, and destined for a career in the church. His father, Johann Philipp Karl von Wessenberg, was a tutor of the princes of the electoral House of Wettin. In 1776 his family returned to Freiburg in Further Austria. His elder brother Johann von Wessenberg later entered the diplomatic service of the Habsburg monarchy.

Ignaz von Wessenberg studied theology at the Jesuit school of Augsburg and the universities of Dillingen, Würzburg and Vienna. He was influenced theologically by Johann Michael Sailer. At the age of eighteen he was already canon at Constance, Augsburg and Basel. In 1798, On behalf of Prince-Bishop Dalberg sent Wessenberg on a diplomatic mission to the newly constituted Helvetic Republic. Pope Pius VII recognized Wessenberg's work at the constitutional deliberations of the Articles of Association in autumn 1801 in Bern, in successfully securing ecclesiastical rights in the Swiss part of the diocese of Constance. 

In 1802, when still a subdeacon, he was appointed Vicar general for the Diocese of Constance by Prince-Bishop Karl Theodor von Dalberg. It was only in 1812 that he was ordained a priest at Fulda at age 38.

Before he became vicar-general he had shown his liberal views of religion and the Catholic Church in a work entitled Der Geist des Zeitalters (Zürich, 1801). In 1802 he founded the monthly review Geistliche Monatsschrift, which he edited and used as a medium to spread his ideas of religious enlightenment. The protests against this review were such that Dalberg ordered its suspension on 25 May 1804. It was replaced by the Konstanzer Pastoralarchiv, which was less offensive and continued to be published annually in two volumes till 1827. For the realization of his pet plans of a National German Church under Primate Dalberg, Wessenberg made futile efforts at the council which Napoleon convened in Paris in 1811 and at the Congress of Vienna in 1815.

Vicar general

A progressive churchman, he set about to abolish everything he considered superfluous or superstitious about religious customs. He did away with various holy days of obligation in the cantons of Aargau and St. Gallen in 1806, and cooperated with the Napoleonic Swiss government at Lucerne in the suppression of monasteries. He gained the support of the clergy, but in the Swiss portion of the Diocese of Constance, Wessenberg's innovations aroused great dissatisfaction.

His orders in case of mixed marriages (1808) to permit the male offspring to be brought up in the religion of the father, the female in the religion of the mother; and especially his many matrimonial and other dispensations that exceeded his competence induced Fabrizio Sceberras Testaferrata, the papal nuncio at Lucerne, to call him to account, but Wessenberg insisted that nothing had been done which exceeded the jurisdiction of the Bishop of Constance, giving Testaferrata at the same time to understand that he did not recognize the Apostolic Nunciature.

Wessenberg attended the Congress of Vienna Congress (1814/15) as the authorized representative of Prince Primate Dalberg, to press for a reorganization of the German church under the leadership of a primate and for the conclusion of a concordat with the Holy See covering all German states. His efforts failed due to the particular interests of both the sovereigns and the Roman Curia. The sovereigns sought state bishops, each subject to their respective rulers, while the Curia was not inclined to see a unified German church with a primitive leadership, like the previous of imperial church structure.

During his administration he was especially noteworthy his deep solicitude for a better training and stricter discipline of the clergy and his insistence on regular Sunday sermons in parish churches and semi-weekly religious instructions in the state schools. He established regularly scheduled pastoral conferences for the continuing education of the clergy. He published a number of prayer books and hymn books for use in his diocese. While he did not reject the traditional forms of Baroque popular piety, as his focus was on strengthening the parishes, he did particularly encourage pilgrimages, festivals, brotherhoods, or people attending monastery churches instead people.

After various requests from the Catholics of Switzerland, Pope Pius VII put an end to Wessenberg's reformist plans in that part of the diocese by severing the Swiss cantons from the Diocese of Constance, in a Brief of 21 October 1814. On 2 November of the same year the Pope ordered Bishop Dalberg to depose Wessenberg without delay from the office of vicar-general. Dalberg kept the Pope's order secret, though in the beginning of 1815 he temporarily replaced Wessenberg as Vicar general by Canon von Roll for private reasons. In the summer of 1815 he requested the government of Baden to confirm the appointment of Wessenberg as his coadjutor bishop with the right of succession. The government acceded to Dalberg's wish, but Rome refused to recognize the coadjutorship.

In the same year Wessenberg published anonymously a notorious anti-papal treatise entitled Die deutsche Kirche, Ein Vorschlag zu ihrer neuen Begründung und Einrichtung. It is a plea for his scheme of a German National Church, and suggests detailed plans as to its organization. On 17 Feb., 1817, seven days after the death of Dalberg, the chapter of Constance elected Wessenberg as Vicar capitular and Diocesan administrator, but his election was invalidated by Pius VII in a Brief of 15 March 1817.

In July Wessenberg went to Rome, hoping to gain the pope to his side and return as primate of his projected German Church or, at least, as Bishop of Constance. He was kindly received by Cardinal Ercole Consalvi, the secretary of state, but was told that, before the pope would enter into any negotiations with him, he would have to resign as administrator and, like François Fénelon, make a declaration to the effect that he disapproved all that the pope disapproves. Refusing to submit to these conditions, he left Rome and with the approval of the government of Baden continued to act as administrator of Constance until 1827, in open disobedience to the pope. Pius VII suppressed the Diocese of Constance in his Bull Provida sollersque of 16 August 1821, incorporating it in the newly erected Archdiocese of Freiburg (whose first archbishop, Bernhard Boll, was appointed in 1827) and the newly erected Diocese of Rottenburg.

After his retirement in 1827 he led a private life as a citizen of Konstanz, where he gave vent to his anti-papal sentiments and spread his rationalistic views on religion and the Church by various treatises and by frequent contributions to the anti-religious review, Die freimüthigen Blätter (Constance, 1830–44). 

Wessenberg died in Konstanz at the age of 85, was buried in the left aisle of the Konstanz Minster.

Legacy
The "sanctuary for morally neglected girls", which he founded in 1855, later became the "Wessenberg social center".

His collection of paintings formed the basis of the Municipal Wessenberg Gallery at the Rosgarten Museum in Constance; his comprehensive private library is today kept at the University of Konstanz.

In 1979, the Wessenberg-Schule in Constance was named in his honor in recognition of his promotion of education.

Works
His chief literary productions are:

Die grossen Kirchenversammlungen des 15. und 16. Jahrhunderts in Beziehung auf Kirchenverbesserung (4 vols., Constance, 1840, 2nd ed., 1845), extremely anti-papal (cf. Hefele, in Tübinger Quartalschrift, 1841, 616 sq.)
Die Stellung des römischen Stuhles gegenuber dem Geiste des 19. Jahrhunderts (Zürich, 1833)
Die Bisthumssynode und die Erfordernisse und Bedingungen einer heilsamen Herstellung derselben (Freiburg, 1849). T

The last-named two works were placed on the Index.

He is also the author of a collection of poems (7 vols., Stuttgart, 1843–54), a number of which were set to music by Beethoven.

References

1774 births
1860 deaths
19th-century German historians
German male non-fiction writers